The Baltimore Orioles Hall of Fame is a team Hall of Fame dedicated to representing the most significant contributors to the history of the Baltimore Orioles professional baseball team since the first season of Baltimore baseball in 1954, which has inducted players, managers, staff, and other contributors. The Hall of Fame is on display at Oriole Park at Camden Yards in Baltimore, Maryland.

See also
Sports Legends Museum at Camden Yards
Babe Ruth Birthplace Museum

References 

H
Major League Baseball museums and halls of fame
Halls of fame in Maryland
Sports museums in Maryland
Museums in Baltimore
Awards established in 1977
1977 establishments in Maryland